It Ended Badly: 13 of the Worst Breakups in History is a 2015 book written by Jennifer Wright that documents thirteen well-known figures, caesars, queens, kings and philosophers and how their romantic relationships ended badly.

References

External links

English-language books
American non-fiction books
Romance
Comedy books
2015 non-fiction books
Henry Holt and Company books